Gabriel Vinicius Menino (born 29 September 2000), known as Gabriel Menino, is a Brazilian professional footballer who plays for Palmeiras. Primarily a midfielder, he can also play as a right-back.

Club career 
Born in Morungaba, São Paulo, Menino joined the Palmeiras youth setup in 2017 from Guarani. In his first year at the club, he was a member of the Copa do Brasil Sub-17 winning team.

On 25 November 2019, Menino was promoted to the first team ahead of the 2020 season. He made his debut on 22 January 2020, in a 4–0 win over Ituano in the Campeonato Paulista, playing the full 90 minutes. He scored for the first time on 17 September 2020, in a 2–1 win over Bolívar in the Copa Libertadores.

International career 
Menino featured for Brazil at the 2019 South American U-20 Championship. On 18 September 2020, he received his first call up to the full side.

On 17 June 2021, Menino was named in the Brazil squad for the 2020 Summer Olympics.

Career statistics

Honours

Club
Palmeiras
Campeonato Paulista: 2020, 2022
Copa do Brasil: 2020
Copa Libertadores: 2020, 2021
Recopa Sudamericana: 2022
Campeonato Brasileiro Série A: 2022
Supercopa do Brasil: 2023

International
Brazil Olympic
Summer Olympics: 2020

Individual
Copa Libertadores Team of the Tournament: 2020
IFFHS CONMEBOL Youth Team Of The Year: 2020
Troféu Mesa Redonda for Revealing the Season in Brazilian Football: 2020
Selection of the Final of the Copa do Brasil: 2020

Top Scorer
Supercopa do Brasil: 2023 (2 goals)

References

External links

2000 births
Living people
Footballers from São Paulo (state)
Brazilian footballers
Association football midfielders
Campeonato Brasileiro Série A players
Sociedade Esportiva Palmeiras players
Brazil youth international footballers
Brazil under-20 international footballers
Copa Libertadores-winning players
Olympic footballers of Brazil
Footballers at the 2020 Summer Olympics
Olympic medalists in football
Olympic gold medalists for Brazil
Medalists at the 2020 Summer Olympics